Zabrus costae is a species of ground beetle in the Pterostichinae subfamily that is endemic to Italy.

References

Beetles described in 1891
Beetles of Europe
Endemic fauna of Italy